IPORT (or other capitalisations) may refer to:

Individual Pitch and Outcome Result Table, in The Hardball Times
IPORT, former division of CAIS Software
iport software Inc, founded by Chic McSherry in 2004
Doncaster iPort, logistics facility in Doncaster, UK